Club Agropecuario Argentino is an Argentine football club sited in Carlos Casares, a city of Buenos Aires Province. Founded in 2011, the club is one of the youngest institutions affiliated to the Argentine Football Association.

The club currently plays in Primera Nacional, the second division of the Argentine football league system.

History
Agropecuario was founded by Bernardo Grobocopatel, a local entrepreneur related to soybean cultivation, who is also owner and president of the club.

The squad participated in now defunct Argentino A where was eliminated by C.A. French in the 2012 season. The next year, Agropecuario finished 6th out of 6 teams in the Argentino B. The club debuted in the Federal B (the regionalised 4th division) in 2014, where it was defeated by Juventud de Pergamino and eliminated from the competition.

Agropecuario promoted to Federal A in 2016 after beating San Martín de Formosa by penalty shoot-out.

The team lasted only one season in the division so in June 2017, Agropecuario crowned 2016–17 champion, therefore promoting to Primera B Nacional, the second division of Argentine football, after Gimnasia y Tiro defeated Gimnasia y Esgrima (M) by 1–0. Agropecuario also became the youngest club to achieve a promotion to B Nacional, with only 6 years of existence. Until then, Crucero del Norte had held the record with 9-yr old when it promoted in 2012.

Notes

References

External links
 

 
Association football clubs established in 2011
2011 establishments in Argentina
Football clubs in Buenos Aires Province